The 1974–75 Washington Bullets played in their 14th season and 2nd in the Washington, D.C. area. The franchise changed their name from the Capital Bullets to the Washington Bullets. The franchise captured its 6th division title in 7 years by posting a franchise best record of 60–22. The Bullets were nearly unbeatable at home posting a record of 36–5 at the Capital Centre.  The Bullets won their second Eastern Conference title, but similar to their 1971 appearance, were swept in the NBA Finals in four games, this time by the Golden State Warriors.

Draft picks

Roster

Regular season

Season standings

Notes
 z, y – division champions
 x – clinched playoff spot

Record vs. opponents

Game log

Preseason

Regular season

|- align="center" bgcolor="#ccffcc"
| 1
| October 19, 19748:05p.m. EDT
| New Orleans
| W 110–92
| Hayes (25)
| Unseld (16)
| Porter (15)
| Capital Centre10,896
| 1–0
|- align="center" bgcolor="#ccffcc"
| 2
| October 22, 19748:35p.m. EDT
| @ Kansas City-Omaha
| W 123–121
| Hayes (35)
| Hayes (14)
| Hayes (7)
| Municipal Auditorium5,385
| 2–0
|- align="center" bgcolor="#ccffcc"
| 3
| October 23, 19748:05p.m. EDT
| Houston
| W 99–95
| Chenier (27)
| Unseld (13)
| Unseld (7)
| Capital Centre5,109
| 3–0
|- align="center" bgcolor="#ccffcc"
| 4
| October 25, 19749:00p.m. EDT
| @ Milwaukee
| W 111–96
| Chenier (29)
| Unseld (15)
| Porter (11)
| Milwaukee Arena10,938
| 4–0
|- align="center" bgcolor="#ccffcc"
| 5
| October 26, 19748:05p.m. EDT
| Milwaukee
| W 101–95
| Hayes (31)
| Unseld (16)
| Porter,Riordan (7)
| Capital Centre7,166
| 5–0
|- align="center" bgcolor="#ccffcc"
| 6
| October 29, 19748:30p.m. EST
| @ Chicago
| W 96–80
| Chenier (27)
| Hayes (12)
| Porter (7)
| Chicago Stadium4,413
| 6–0
|- align="center" bgcolor="#ccffcc"
| 7
| October 30, 19748:05p.m. EST
| New York
| W 94–86
| Hayes (21)
| Unseld (22)
| Porter (6)
| Capital Centre7,842
| 7–0
|- align="center" bgcolor="#ffcccc"
| 8
| October 31, 19749:05p.m. EST
| @ Houston
| L 92–95
| Chenier (29)
| Unseld (15)
| Porter,Unseld (6)
| Hofheinz Pavilion2,164
| 7–1

|- align="center" bgcolor="#ccffcc"
| 9
| November 2, 19748:05p.m. EST
| Phoenix
| W 108–94
| Riordan (39)
| Unseld (21)
| Porter (7)
| Capital Centre9,168
| 8–1
|- align="center" bgcolor="#ffcccc"
| 10
| November 6, 19748:05p.m. EST
| Cleveland
| L 99–107
| Unseld (21)
| Hayes (15)
| Porter,Riordan (4)
| Capital Centre5,110
| 8–2
|- align="center" bgcolor="#ccffcc"
| 11
| November 9, 19748:05p.m. EST
| Chicago
| W 96–89
| Jones (21)
| Unseld (14)
| Porter (11)
| Capital Centre8,083
| 9–2
|- align="center" bgcolor="#ccffcc"
| 12
| November 13, 19748:05p.m. EST
| Kansas City-Omaha
| W 118–81
| Chenier (25)
| Unseld (15)
| Porter (13)
| Capital Centre5,521
| 10–2
|- align="center" bgcolor="#ccffcc"
| 13
| November 15, 19748:35p.m. EST
| @ New Orleans
| W 104–95
| Hayes (34)
| Hayes (14)
| Chenier (6)
| New Orleans Municipal Auditorium5,275
| 11–2
|- align="center" bgcolor="#ffcccc"
| 14
| November 16, 19748:05p.m. EST
| Boston
| L 109–124
| Hayes (33)
| Unseld (16)
| Porter (7)
| Capital Centre16,204
| 11–3
|- align="center" bgcolor="#ffcccc"
| 15
| November 19, 19748:05p.m. EST
| @ New York
| L 85–86
| Hayes (24)
| Hayes (16)
| Porter (6)
| Madison Square Garden18,444
| 11–4
|- align="center" bgcolor="#ffcccc"
| 16
| November 20, 19748:05p.m. EST
| Buffalo
| L 104–115
| Hayes (30)
| Hayes (14)
| Porter (11)
| Capital Centre8,640
| 11–5
|- align="center" bgcolor="#ccffcc"
| 17
| November 22, 197411:00p.m. EST
| @ Portland
| W 117–99
| Chenier (36)
| Hayes (12)
| Porter (11)
| Memorial Coliseum11,868
| 12–5
|- align="center" bgcolor="#ccffcc"
| 18
| November 24, 197410:00p.m. EST
| @ Los Angeles
| W 111–108
| Chenier,Jones (24)
| Unseld (15)
| Hayes (5)
| The Forum11,857
| 13–5
|- align="center" bgcolor="#ffcccc"
| 19
| November 26, 19748:05p.m. EST
| @ Atlanta
| L 102–119
| Chenier,Hayes (30)
| Hayes (12)
| Porter (7)
| The Omni4,268
| 13–6
|- align="center" bgcolor="#ccffcc"
| 20
| November 27, 19748:05p.m. EST
| Atlanta
| W 114–104
| Chenier (31)
| Unseld (19)
| porter (9)
| Capital Centre7,012
| 14–6
|- align="center" bgcolor="#ccffcc"
| 21
| November 29, 19748:00p.m. EST
| @ Buffalo
| W 96–93
| Chenier (29)
| Hayes,Unseld (13)
| Riordan (6)
| Buffalo Memorial Auditorium16,209
| 15–6
|- align="center" bgcolor="#ccffcc"
| 22
| November 30, 19748:05p.m. EST
| Seattle
| W 122–90
| Hayes (20)
| Unseld (13)
| Porter (10)
| Capital Centre8,865
| 16–6

|- align="center" bgcolor="#ccffcc"
| 23
| December 4, 19748:05p.m. EST
| Portland
| W 114–87
| Hayes (25)
| Unseld (21)
| Porter,Unseld (6)
| Capital Centre6,306
| 17–6
|- align="center" bgcolor="#ccffcc"
| 24
| December 7, 19748:05p.m. EST
| Detroit
| W 94–89
| Chenier (31)
| Unseld (16)
| Porter (5)
| Capital Centre9,094
| 18–6
|- align="center" bgcolor="#ccffcc"
| 25
| December 8, 19747:35p.m. EST
| @ Cleveland
| W 88–75
| Chenier (24)
| Hayes (16)
| Jones (8)
| Richfield Coliseum8,148
| 19–6
|- align="center" bgcolor="#ffcccc"
| 26
| December 11, 19747:35p.m. EST
| @ Detroit
| L 89–103
| Chenier (18)
| Unseld (6)
| Porter (10)
| Cobo Arena5,376
| 19–7
|- align="center" bgcolor="#ccffcc"
| 27
| December 13, 19747:30p.m. EST
| @ Boston
| W 108–89
| Hayes (24)
| Unseld (15)
| Porter (10)
| Boston Garden15,320
| 20–7
|- align="center" bgcolor="#ccffcc"
| 28
| December 14, 19748:05p.m. EST
| Golden State
| W 99–91
| Chenier (29)
| Unseld (17)
| Porter (11)
| Capital Centre10,396
| 20–8
|- align="center" bgcolor="#ffcccc"
| 29
| December 17, 19748:05p.m. EST
| @ Atlanta
| L 85–96
| Chenier (20)
| Robinson (8)
| Porter (4)
| The Omni3,047
| 21–8
|- align="center" bgcolor="#ccffcc"
| 30
| December 18, 19748:05p.m. EST
| New Orleans
| W 113–90
| Chenier (19)
| Hayes (15)
| Porter (8)
| Capital Centre4,227
| 22–8
|- align="center" bgcolor="#ffcccc"
| 31
| December 20, 19749:05p.m. EST
| @ Houston
| L 91–116
| Chenier (23)
| Hayes (6)
| Hayes,Jones (5)
| Hofheinz Pavilion3,875
| 22–9
|- align="center" bgcolor="#ccffcc"
| 32
| December 21, 19748:05p.m. EST
| Philadelphia
| W 117–101
| Porter,Riordan (29)
| Unseld (18)
| Porter (10)
| Capital Centre5,792
| 23–9
|- align="center" bgcolor="#ccffcc"
| 33
| December 23, 19749:00p.m. EST
| @ Milwaukee
| W 106–103 (OT)
| Hayes (34)
| Unseld (25)
| Porter (8)
| Milwaukee Arena10,938
| 24–9
|- align="center" bgcolor="#ccffcc"
| 34
| December 25, 19748:05p.m. EST
| Atlanta
| W 110–92
| Riordan (23)
| Unseld (21)
| Chenier (7)
| Capital Centre10,341
| 25–9
|- align="center" bgcolor="#ccffcc"
| 35
| December 30, 19748:05p.m. EST
| Cleveland
| W 103–90
| Riordan (27)
| Unseld (28)
| Porter (10)
| Capital Centre8,101
| 26–9

|- align="center" bgcolor="#ffcccc"
| 36
| January 1, 197511:00p.m. EST
| @ Seattle
| L 118–123 (OT)
| Hayes (29)
| Unseld (25)
| Unseld (6)
| Seattle Center Coliseum12,363
| 26–10
|- align="center" bgcolor="#ffcccc"
| 37
| January 4, 197511:05p.m. EST
| @ Golden State
| L 96–104
| Riordan (19)
| Hayes (15)
| Porter (9)
| Oakland–Alameda County Coliseum Arena12,787
| 25–12
|- align="center" bgcolor="#ffcccc"
| 38
| January 5, 197510:00p.m. EST
| @ Los Angeles
| L 109–112 (OT)
| Riordan (34)
| Unseld (17)
| Porter (13)
| The Forum13,386
| 26–12
|- align="center" bgcolor="#ccffcc"
| 39
| January 8, 19759:30p.m. EST
| @ Phoenix
| W 102–95
| Riordan (31)
| Unseld (16)
| Unseld (8)
| Arizona Veterans Memorial Coliseum6,770
| 27–12
|- align="center" bgcolor="#ccffcc"
| 40
| January 9, 19759:05p.m. EST
| @ Houston
| W 102–94
| Hayes (23)
| Hayes (15)
| Porter (8)
| Hofheinz Pavilion4,216
| 28–12
|- align="center" bgcolor="#ccffcc"
| 41
| January 11, 19758:05p.m. EST
| Los Angeles
| W 102–90
| Chenier (26)
| Unseld (22)
| Porter (10)
| Capital Centre13,868
| 29–12
|- align="center"
|colspan="9" bgcolor="#bbcaff"|All-Star Break
|- style="background:#cfc;"
|- bgcolor="#bbffbb"
|- align="center" bgcolor="#ffcccc"
| 42
| January 16, 19758:05p.m. EST
| @ Atlanta
| L 85–108
| Chenier (16)
| Unseld (15)
| Chenier (7)
| The Omni3,034
| 29–13
|- align="center" bgcolor="#ccffcc"
| 43
| January 17, 19758:05p.m. EST
| @ Philadelphia
| W 103–92
| Hayes (31)
| Unseld (16)
| Porter (10)
| The Spectrum9,176
| 30–13
|- align="center" bgcolor="#ccffcc"
| 44
| January 18, 19758:05p.m. EST
| Golden State
| W 125–101
| Riordan (32)
| Unseld (15)
| Porter,Unseld (7)
| Capital Centre19,035
| 31–13
|- align="center" bgcolor="#ccffcc"
| 45
| January 21, 19758:05p.m. EST
| @ Cleveland
| W 97–88
| Riordan (22)
| Unseld (12)
| Porter (6)
| Richfield Coliseum4,718
| 32–13
|- align="center" bgcolor="#ccffcc"
| 46
| January 22, 19758:05p.m. EST
| Kansas City-Omaha
| W 97–88
| Chenier (33)
| Unseld (17)
| Porter (9)
| Capital Centre4,719
| 33–13
|- align="center" bgcolor="#ccffcc"
| 47
| January 25, 19758:05p.m. EST
| Cleveland
| W 94–92
| Chenier (25)
| Unseld (20)
| Unseld (10)
| Capital Centre7,178
| 34–13
|- align="center" bgcolor="#ccffcc"
| 48 
| January 26, 19751:35p.m. EST
| Houston
| W 118–90
| Hayes (24)
| Unseld (15)
| Chenier (8)
| Capital Centre7,939
| 35–13
|- align="center" bgcolor="#ccffcc"
| 49
| January 31, 19758:35p.m. EST
| @ New Orleans
| W 106–101
| Hayes (31)
| Unseld (16)
| Porter (8)
| Loyola Field House2,812
| 36–13

|- align="center" bgcolor="#ffcccc"
| 50
| February 2, 19752:00p.m. EST
| @ Chicago
| L 80–97
| Chenier (19)
| Hayes (11)
| Jones (4)
| Chicago Stadium10,885
| 36–14
|- align="center" bgcolor="#ffcccc"
| 51
| February 4, 19759:30p.m. EST
| @ Phoenix
| L 89–90
| Hayes (27)
| Unseld (12)
| Porter (11)
| Arizona Veterans Memorial Coliseum4,263
| 36–15
|- align="center" bgcolor="#ccffcc"
| 52
| February 6, 197511:05p.m. EST
| @ Golden State
| W 98–97
| Chenier (31)
| Hayes (16)
| Porter (8)
| Oakland–Alameda County Coliseum Arena12,787
| 37–15
|- align="center" bgcolor="#ccffcc"
| 53
| February 7, 197511:00p.m. EST
| @ Seattle
| W 99–76
| Chenier (28)
| Unseld (19)
| Porter (9)
| Seattle Center Coliseum12,720
| 38–15
|- align="center" bgcolor="#ffcccc"
| 54
| February 8, 197511:00p.m. EST
| @ Portland
| L 96–100
| Hayes (25)
| Hayes (12)
| Unseld (6)
| Memorial Coliseum8,405
| 38–16
|- align="center" bgcolor="#ccffcc"
| 55
| February 12, 19758:05p.m. EST
| Milwaukee
| W 112–108 (OT)
| Hayes (35)
| Unseld (21)
| Unseld (9)
| Capital Centre15,331
| 39–16
|- align="center" bgcolor="#ccffcc"
| 56
| February 15, 19758:05p.m. EST
| @ New York
| W 108–106 (OT)
| Hayes (31)
| Hayes (16)
| Porter (7)
| Madison Square Garden19,694
| 40–16
|- align="center" bgcolor="#ccffcc"
| 57
| February 16, 19753:15p.m. EST
| New York
| W 125–104
| Hayes (33)
| Unseld (18)
| Porter (11)
| Capital Centre19,035
| 41–16
|- align="center" bgcolor="#ccffcc"
| 58
| February 19, 19758:05p.m. EST
| Phoenix
| W 120–97
| Hayes (32)
| Hayes (15)
| Porter (7),Unseld (7)
| Capital Centre6,201
| 42–16
|- align="center" bgcolor="#ffcccc"
| 59
| February 20, 19758:05p.m. EST
| @ Cleveland
| L 95–106
| Chenier (29)
| Unseld (10)
| Porter (6)
| Richfield Coliseum6,728
| 42–17
|- align="center" bgcolor="#ccffcc"
| 60
| February 21, 19757:35p.m. EST
| @ Detroit
| W 121–96
| Chenier (30)
| Hayes (15)
| Porter (11)
| Cobo Arena9,571
| 43–17
|- align="center" bgcolor="#ccffcc"
| 61
| February 23, 19751:00p.m. EST
| Portland
| W 113–98
| Chenier,Hayes (21)
| Unseld (15)
| Hayes (7)
| Capital Centre8,294
| 44–17
|- align="center" bgcolor="#ccffcc"
| 62
| February 25, 19758:00p.m. EST
| @ Buffalo
| W 111–93
| Hayes (31)
| Unseld (17)
| Porter (14)
| Buffalo Memorial Auditorium13,964
| 45–17
|- align="center" bgcolor="#ccffcc"
| 63
| February 26, 19758:05p.m. EST
| Seattle
| W 104–98
| Hayes (39)
| Hayes (19)
| Chenier (7)
| Capital Centre6,202
| 46–17
|- align="center" bgcolor="#ccffcc"
| 64
| February 28, 19757:05p.m. EST
| Detroit
| W 106–95
| Hayes (35)
| Hayes (12)
| Chenier (8)
| Capital Centre11,121
| 47–17

|- align="center" bgcolor="#ccffcc"
| 65
| March 2, 19751:00p.m. EST
| Los Angeles
| W 117–104
| Chenier (27)
| Hayes (15)
| Porter (21)
| Capital Centre8,020
| 48–17
|- align="center" bgcolor="#ccffcc"
| 66
| March 5, 19758:05p.m. EST
| Atlanta
| W 118–112
| Hayes (30)
| Hayes (15)
| Porter (22)
| Capital Centre6,266
| 49–17
|- align="center" bgcolor="#ccffcc"
| 67
| March 8, 19758:05p.m. EST
| @ Philadelphia
| W 113–92
| Chenier (28)
| Hayes (14)
| Hayes,Riordan (5)
| The Spectrum7,848
| 50–17
|- align="center" bgcolor="#ffcccc"
| 68
| March 9, 19751:30p.m. EST
| Philadelphia
| L 100–113
| Hayes (28)
| Hayes (12)
| Porter (9)
| Capital Centre8,473
| 50–18
|- align="center" bgcolor="#ccffcc"
| 69
| March 11, 19758:05p.m. EST
| @ Atlanta
| W 99–87
| Chenier (38)
| Hayes (15)
| Porter (10)
| The Omni2,955
| 51–18
|- align="center" bgcolor="#ccffcc"
| 70
| March 12, 19758:05p.m. EST
| Houston
| W 115–88
| Riordan (26)
| Hayes (10)
| Kozelko (8)
| Capital Centre6,059
| 52–18
|- align="center" bgcolor="#ffcccc"
| 71
| March 14, 19758:35p.m. EST
| @ Kansas City-Omaha
| L 102–103
| Chenier (32)
| Hayes (26)
| Chenier,Hayes,Riordan,Robinson (3)
| Omaha Civic Auditorium8,524
| 52–19
|- align="center" bgcolor="#ffcccc"
| 72
| March 18, 19758:05p.m. EST
| @ Cleveland
| L 98–112
| Riordan (20)
| Kozelko (9)
| Porter (11)
| Richfield Coliseum6,823
| 52–20
|- align="center" bgcolor="#ccffcc"
| 73
| March 19, 19758:05p.m. EST
| Boston
| W 97–80
| Hayes (29)
| Hayes (12)
| Porter (11)
| Capital Centre19,035
| 53–20
|- align="center" bgcolor="#ccffcc"
| 74
| March 21, 19758:35p.m. EST
| @ New Orleans
| W 122–109
| Hayes (28)
| Hayes (13)
| Porter (9)
| New Orleans Municipal Auditorium6,273
| 54–20
|- align="center" bgcolor="#ccffcc"
| 75
| March 22, 19758:05p.m. EST
| Cleveland
| W 100–97
| Hayes (28)
| Hayes (13)
| Porter (10)
| Capital Centre8,471
| 55–20
|- align="center" bgcolor="#ffcccc"
| 76 
| March 26, 19758:05p.m. EST
| Buffalo
| L 91–94
| Chenier (21)
| Unseld (17)
| Porter,Riordan (6)
| Capital Centre15,226
| 56–20
|- align="center" bgcolor="#ccffcc"
| 77
| March 30, 19752:00p.m. EST
| Chicago
| W 94–82
| Hayes (37)
| Hayes,Unseld (11)
| Porter (11)
| Capital Centre10,149
| 56–21

|- align="center" bgcolor="#ccffcc"
| 78
| April 1, 19758:35p.m. EST
| @ New Orleans
| W 110–101
| Hayes (33)
| Unseld (16)
| Porter (10)
| New Orleans Municipal Auditorium7,312
| 57–21
|- align="center" bgcolor="#ccffcc"
| 79
| April 2, 19758:05p.m. EST
| Houston
| W 112–85
| Hayes (33)
| Unseld (18)
| Porter (13)
| Capital Centre7,748
| 58–21
|- align="center" bgcolor="#ffcccc"
| 80
| April 4, 19757:30p.m. EST
| @ Boston
| L 94–95
| Porter (19)
| Hayes (14)
| Porter (9)
| Boston Garden15,320
| 58–22
|- align="center" bgcolor="#ccffcc"
| 81
| April 5, 19758:05p.m. EST
| Atlanta
| W 123–115
| Hayes (31)
| Unseld (22)
| Porter (11)
| Capital Centre8,273
| 59–22
|- align="center" bgcolor="#ccffcc"
| 82
| April 6, 19751:05p.m. EST
| New Orleans
| W 119–103
| Hayes (23)
| Unseld (30)
| Jones,Unseld (5)
| Capital Centre13,267
| 60–22

Player stats
Note: GP=Games played; MP=Minutes Played; FG=Field Goals; FGA=Field Goal Attempts; FG%=Field Goal Percentage; FT=Free Throws; FTA=Free Throws Attempts; FT%=Free Throw Percentage; ORB=Offensive Rebounds; DRB=Defensive Rebounds; TRB=Total Rebounds; AST=Assists; STL=Steals; BLK=Blocks; PF=Personal Fouls; PTS=Points; AVG=Average

Team Stats
Note: G=Games; MP=Minutes Played; FG=Field Goals; FGA=Field Goal Attempts; FG%=Field Goal Percentage; FT=Free Throws; FTA=Free Throw Attempts; FT%=Free Throw Percentage; ORB=Offensive Rebounds; DRB=Defensive Rebounds; TRB=Total Rebounds; AST=Assists; STL=Steals; BLK=Blocks; TOV=Turnovers; PF=Personal Fouls; PTS=Points

Playoffs

|- align="center" bgcolor="#ffcccc"
| 1
| April 10, 19758:05p.m. EST
| Buffalo
| L 102–113
| Chenier (23)
| Hayes (9)
| Jones (5)
| Capital Centre17,140
| 0–1
|- align="center" bgcolor="#ccffcc"
| 2
| April 12, 19758:00p.m. EST
| @ Buffalo
| W 120–106
| Hayes (34)
| Unseld (25)
| Porter (10)
| Buffalo Memorial Auditorium17,189
| 1–1
|- align="center" bgcolor="#ccffcc"
| 3
| April 16, 19758:05p.m. EST
| Buffalo
| W 111–96
| Elvin Hayes (30)
| Unseld (18)
| Porter (13)
| Capital Centre19,035
| 2–1
|- align="center" bgcolor="#ffcccc"
| 4
| April 18, 19759:00p.m. EST
| @ Buffalo
| L 102–108
| Weatherspoon (21)
| Unseld (23)
| Porter (10)
| Buffalo Memorial Auditorium15,307
| 2–2
|- align="center" bgcolor="#ccffcc"
| 5
| April 20, 19751:00p.m. EST
| Buffalo
| W 97–93
| Hayes (46)
| Hayes,Unseld (12)
| Porter (8)
| Capital Centre18,820
| 3–2
|- align="center" bgcolor="#ffcccc"
| 6
| April 23, 19758:00p.m. EST
| @ Buffalo
| L 96–102
| Chenier (25)
| Unseld (12)
| Chenier,Unseld (6)
| Buffalo Memorial Auditorium15,172
| 3–3
|- align="center" bgcolor="#ccffcc"
| 7
| April 25, 19758:05p.m. EST
| Buffalo
| W 115–96
| Chenier (39)
| Unseld (12)
| Porter (8)
| Capital Centre19,035
| 4–3
|-

|- align="center" bgcolor="#ccffcc"
| 1
| April 27, 19752:30p.m. EDT
| @ Boston
| W 100–95
| Hayes (34)
| Unseld (14)
| Porter (7)
| Boston Garden15,320
| 1–0
|- align="center" bgcolor="#ccffcc"
| 2
| April 30, 19758:05p.m. EDT
| Boston
| W 117–92
| Hayes (29)
| Unseld (16)
| Porter (6)
| Capital Centre19,035
| 2–0
|- align="center" bgcolor="#ffcccc"
| 3
| May 3, 19752:30p.m. EDT
| @ Boston
| L 90–101
| Hayes (23)
| Unseld (15)
| Porter (5)
| Boston Garden15,320
| 2–1
|- align="center" bgcolor="#ccffcc"
| 4
| May 7, 19758:05p.m. EDT
| Boston
| W 119–108
| Chenier (27)
| Unseld (25)
| Unseld (7)
| Capital Centre19,035
| 3–1
|- align="center" bgcolor="#ffcccc"
| 5
| May 9, 19757:30p.m. EDT
| @ Boston
| L 99–103
| Chenier (32)
| Unseld (13)
| Porter (6)
| Boston Garden15,320
| 3–2
|- align="center" bgcolor="#ccffcc"
| 6
| May 11, 19753:00p.m. EDT
| Boston
| W 98–92
| Chenier (24)
| Unseld (17)
| Porter (11)
| Capital Centre19,035
| 4–2
|-

|- align="center" bgcolor="#ffcccc"
| 1
| May 18, 19753:00p.m. EDT
| Golden State
| L 95–101
| Hayes (29)
| Hayes,Unseld (16)
| Unseld (6)
| Capital Centre19,035
| 0–1
|- align="center" bgcolor="#ffcccc"
| 2
| May 20, 19759:00p.m. EDT
| @ Golden State
| L 91–92
| Chenier (30)
| Unseld (20)
| Porter (8)
| Cow Palace13,225
| 0–2
|- align="center" bgcolor="#ffcccc"
| 3
| May 23, 19759:00p.m. EDT
| @ Golden State
| L 101–109
| Hayes (24)
| Unseld (15)
| Porter (6)
| Cow Palace13,225
| 0–3
|- align="center" bgcolor="#ffcccc"
| 4
| May 25, 19753:00p.m. EDT
| Golden State
| L 95–96
| Chenier (26)
| Unseld (16)
| Chenier (11)
| Capital Centre19,035
| 0–4
|-

Playoffs player stats
Note: GP=Games played; MP=Minutes Played; FG=Field Goals; FGA=Field Goal Attempts; FG%=Field Goal Percentage; FT=Free Throws; FTA=Free Throw Attempts; FT%=Free Throw Percentage; ORB=Offensive Rebounds; DRB=Defensive Rebounds; TRB=Total Rebounds; AST=Assists; STL=Steals; BLK=Blocks; PF=Personal Fouls; PTS=Points; AVG=Average

Awards and honors
 Elvin Hayes, All-NBA First Team
 Phil Chenier, All-NBA Second Team
 Elvin Hayes, NBA All-Defensive Second Team

References

 Bullets on Basketball Reference

Washington
Washington Wizards seasons
Eastern Conference (NBA) championship seasons
Wash
Wash